Celles (variant: (San Juan de Celles) is one of three parishes (administrative divisions) in Noreña, a municipality within the province and autonomous community of Asturias, in northern Spain.

Villages
 La Braña 
 La Carril 
 La Felguera 
 La Peral
 Otero
 San Andrés
 Serrapicón

Parishes in Noreña